The Wallflowers is the Wallflowers' debut album, released on August 25, 1992 on Virgin Records. The song "Ashes to Ashes" was released as a single from the album a week before the album's release.

Track listing
All songs written and composed by Jakob Dylan, except "After the Blackbird Sings" composed by Dylan, Peter Yanowitz, Tobi Miller, Barrie Maguire and Rami Jaffee.
 "Shy of the Moon" – 3:17
 "Sugarfoot" – 5:28
 "Sidewalk Annie" – 5:18
 "Hollywood" – 7:02
 "Be Your Own Girl" – 5:16
 "Another One in the Dark" – 6:31
 "Ashes to Ashes" – 5:00
 "After the Blackbird Sings" – 4:49
 "Somebody Else's Money" – 8:26
 "Asleep at the Wheel" – 4:49
 "Honeybee" – 9:14
 "For the Life of Me" – 4:16

Personnel
The Wallflowers
Jakob Dylan – lead vocals, rhythm guitar, piano
Rami Jaffee – keyboards, backing vocals
Tobi Miller – lead guitar
Barrie Maguire – bass guitar, backing vocals
Peter Yanowitz – drums, percussion

References

The Wallflowers albums
1992 debut albums
Virgin Records albums
Albums produced by Paul Fox (record producer)